Gazal is a 1964 Urdu romance musical film directed by Ved-Madan, starring Sunil Dutt, Meena Kumari and Prithviraj Kapoor. The muslim social film is about the right of young generation to the marriage of their choice. It had music by Madan Mohan with lyrics by Sahir Ludhianvi, featuring notable filmi-ghazals such as "Rang Aur Noor Ki Baraat", performed by Mohammed Rafi and "Naghma O Sher Ki Saugaat", performed by Lata Mangeshkar.

Plot
Set in Agra, the film is the story of Ejaz (Sunil Dutt), who is editor of Inquilab. When he listens to Naaz Ara Begum (Meena Kumari) sing, he falls deeply in love with her. However, he soon loses his job. Ejaz and Naaz manage to meet secretly, with help of Naaz's sister Kausar. This relationship has many people going angry, first Nawab Bakar Ali Khan (Prithviraj Kapoor) her father who wants Naaz to marry Akhtar Nawab (Rehman), her paternal cousin.

Cast & Characters

Music
There are 3 songs with the same radif: Kise Pesh Karoon — Naghma-o-Sher Ki Saugaat Kise Pesh Karoon (Lata), Ishq Ki Garmi-e-Jazbaat Kise Pesh Karoon (Rafi) and Rang Aur Noor Ki Baaraat Kise Pesh Karoon (Rafi). The first two are happy songs, while the last one is a sad song. The last stanzas of the first two songs are identical.

Songs List:-
 Naghma O Sher Ki Saugaat - Lata Mangeshkar
 Ishq Ki Garmiye Jazbaat - Mohammed Rafi
 Unse Nazrein Mili - Lata Mangeshkar, Minoo Purshottam, Chorus
 Dil Khush Hai Aaj - Mohammed Rafi
 Mujhe Yeh Phool Na De - Suman Kalyanpur, Mohammed Rafi
 Ada Qatil Nazar Barke - Asha Bhosle
 Rang Aur Noor Ki Baraat - Mohammed Rafi
 Taj Tere Liye Ek Mazhar-e-Ulfat ... Mere Mehboob Kahin Aur - Mohammed Rafi

References

External links
 
 

1964 films
1960s Hindi-language films
1960s Urdu-language films
Indian romantic drama films
Indian black-and-white films
Films set in Uttar Pradesh
Films scored by Madan Mohan
1964 romantic drama films
Urdu-language Indian films